Events in the year 2013 in Germany.

Incumbents

Federal level

 President: Joachim Gauck
 Chancellor: Angela Merkel

State level
 Minister-President of Baden-Wuerttemberg – Winfried Kretschmann
 Minister-President of Bavaria – Horst Seehofer
 Mayor of Berlin – Klaus Wowereit
 Minister-President of Brandenburg – Matthias Platzeck
 Mayor of Bremen – Jens Boehrnsen
 Mayor of Hamburg – Olaf Scholz
 Minister-President of Hesse – Volker Bouffier
 Minister-President of Mecklenburg-Vorpommern – Erwin Sellering
 Minister-President of Niedersachsen – David McAllister (until 18 February), Stephan Weil
 Minister-President of North Rhine-Westphalia – Hannelore Kraft
 Minister-President of Rhineland-Palatinate – Kurt Beck (until 16 January), Malu Dreyer
 Minister-President of Saarland – Annegret Kramp-Karrenbauer
 Minister-President of Saxony – Stanislaw Tillich
 Minister-President of Saxony-Anhalt – Reiner Haseloff
 Minister-President of Schleswig-Holstein – Torsten Albig
 Minister-President of Thuringia – Christine Lieberknecht

Events

January – June
 January  – Bavarian Film Awards in Munich
 16 January - Malu Dreyer becomes Minister-President of Rhineland-Palatinate, succeeding Kurt Beck, who had served in this position since 1994.
 20 January - Lower Saxony state election, 2013 in Niedersachsen 
 30 January - German Snooker Masters in Berlin
 7–17 February - 63rd Berlin International Film Festival
 9 February - Education minister Annette Schavan resigns after having her doctorate removed following a plagiarism scandal.
 9–19 February  – 63rd Berlin International Film Festival in Berlin
 13 February - The Europe-wide horsemeat scandal spreads to Germany, as some supermarket products sold as beef are found to contain it.
 14 February - Germany in the Eurovision Song Contest 2013 - Cascada is selected to represent Germany.
 March  – CeBIT in Hanover
 March  – ITB Berlin in Berlin
 March – Leipzig Book Fair in Leipzig
 18 March -200 year anniversary of German poet and playwright Christian Friedrich Hebbel 
 April – Hannover Messe in Hanover
 April – Deutscher Filmpreis in Berlin
 1–5 May - German Evangelical Church Day 2013 in Hamburg
 18 May - Cascada represent Germany at the Eurovision Song Contest in Malmö, Sweden.
 22 May - 150 year birthday of Social Democratic Party of Germany and in Leipzig organisation Progressive Alliance was found.
 22 May - 200 year anniversary of German composer Richard Wagner 
 25 May - German football team Bayern Munich win in London Champions League, beating Borussia Dortmund 2-1
 June  – Kiel Week in Kiel
 June - Heavy floods affect primarily the southern and eastern states of (Bavaria, Saxony and Thuringia).

July – December 
 August – Hanse Sail in Rostock
 August- September – Internationale Funkausstellung Berlin in Berlin
 10 September Olympic fencing champion German Thomas Bach elected President of the International Olympic Committee to succeed Jacques Rogge.
 16 September - Bavaria state election, 2013 in Bavaria
 September – ILA Berlin Air Show in Berlin
 September – Gamescom in Cologne
 September – Frankfurt Motor Show in Frankfurt
 September - October – Oktoberfest in Munich
 22 September - German federal election, 2013
 22 September - Hesse state election, 2013 in Hesse
 October – Frankfurt Book Fair
 October/November -  In German media and public the 2013 global surveillance disclosures is on media and politic topic and German people got to know, that the mobile phone of chancellor Angela Merkel was hacked by NSA since 2002.
 3 November - Referendum on the recommunalization of energy supply in Berlin
 7 December - 26th European Film Awards in Berlin
 17 December - The Third Merkel cabinet led by Angela Merkel was sworn in.

Deaths

January 

 3 January - Thomas Schäuble, 64, German politician, complications following a heart attack. (born 1948)
 6 January -  Gerhard Fieber, 96, animation pioneer, producer and director, natural causes. (born 1916)
 9 January - Werner Altegoer, 77, businessman and football administrator (born 1935)
 15 January - Princess Margarita of Baden, 80, aristocrat (born 1932)
 17 January - Jakob Arjouni, 48, writer (born 1964)
 19 January - Hans Massaquoi, 86, German-born American journalist and editor (born 1926)
 24 January - Gottfried Landwehr, 83, physicist (born 1929)

February 
 3 February - Wolfgang Abraham, 71, footballer (born 1942)
 7 February - Jurgen Untermann, 84, linguist (born 1928)
 8 February - Dieter Schutte, 89, publisher (born 1923)
 9 February - Aki Orr, 81, German-born Israeli politician and writer (born 1931)
 13 February - Stefan Wigger, 80, actor (born 1932)
 18 February - Otfried Preußler, 89, children's book author (born 1923)
 18 February - Otto Beisheim, 88, manager (born 1924)
 19 February - Hubert Schieth, 86, football manager (born 1927)
 22 February - Wolfgang Sawallisch, 89, conductor and pianist (born 1923)

March 

 3 March: Johann Eekhoff (71), economist (born 1941)
 5 March: Dieter Pfaff (65), actor (born 1947)
 6 March: Sabine Bischoff (54), fencer (born 1958)
 8 March: Ewald-Heinrich von Kleist-Schmenzin (90), officer (born 1922)
 11 March: Martin Adolf Bormann (82), theologian (born 1930)
 13 March: Rolf Schult (85), actor (born 1927)
 20 March: Nasser El Sonbaty (47), bodybuilder (born 1965)
 23 March: Reinhard Lakomy, German songwriter, composer (born 1946)
 28 March: Heinz Patzig, (83) footballer (born 1929)

April 

 6 April: Ottmar Schreiner (67), politician (born 1946)
 10 April: Bernhard Rieger (90), prelate of the Roman Catholic Church (born 1922)
 16 April: Reinhard Lettmann (80), bishop of the Roman Catholic Church (born 1933)

May 

 5 May: Sarah Kirsch: German poet (born 1935)
 12 May: Gerd Langguth (66), German author and professor of policial science (born 1946)
 17 May: Peter Schulz (81), German politician (born 1930)
 18 May: Ernst Klee (71), German journalist and author (born 1942)
 18 May: Lothar Schmid (85), German chess grandmaster (born 1928)
 23 May: Moritz, Landgrave of Hesse (86), German art collector (born 1926)
 24 May: Gotthard Graubner, German painter (born 1930)
 26 May: Hildegard Krekel (60), German actress (born 1952)
 28 May: Eddi Arent (88), German actor (born 1925)

June 
 8 June: Willi Sitte (92), German painter (born 1921)
 9 June: Walter Jens (90), German philosoph (born 1923)
 13 June: Gotthard Graubner (82), German painter (born 1930)
 15 June: Heinz Flohe (65), German footballer (born 1948)
 16 June: Ottmar Walter (89), German footballer (born 1924)

July 
 1 July: Ulrich Matschoss (96), German actor (born 1917)
 11 July: Egbert Brieskorn (77), German mathematician (born 1936)
 19 July: Bert Trautmann (89), German footballer (born 1923)
 29 July: Ludwig Averkamp (86), German prelate of Roman Catholic Church (born 1927)
 30 July: Berthold Beitz (99), German businessman (born 1913)

August 
 13 August: Lothar Bisky (71), German politician (born 1941)
 17 August: Claus Jacobi (86), German journalist (born 1927)
 25 August: Karl-Wilhelm Welwei, German historian (born 1930)

September 

 12 September: Erich Loest (87), German writer (born 1926)
 12 September: Otto Sander (72), German actor (born 1941)
 18 September: Marcel Reich-Ranicki (93), German literary critic (born 1920)
 21 September: Walter Wallmann, German politician (born 1932)
 23 September: Paul Kuhn (85), German band leader (born 1928)

October 
 11 October - Klaus Behrendt (92), German television actor (born 1920)
 15 October - Hans Riegel (90), German entrepreneur (born 1923)
 29 October - Rudolf Kehrer (90), German classical pianist (born 1923)

November 

 4 November: Hans von Borsody (84), German film actor (born 1929)
 7 November: Manfred Rommel (84), German politician (born 1928)
 7 November: Christian Tasche (56), German television actor (born 1957)
 20 November: Dieter Hildebrandt (86), German Kabarett artist (born 1927)

December 
 5 December: Günther Förg (61), German painter (born 1952)
 9 December: Peter Urban (72), German translator and writer (born 1941)
 15 December: Helmar Frank (80), German mathematician (born 1933)
 24 December: Helga M. Novak (78), German writer (born 1935)
 28 December: Margrit Kennedy (74), German architect (born 1939)
 31 December: Irina Korschunow (88), German writer (born 1925)

See also
2013 in German television

References

 
Years of the 21st century in Germany